Ison, ISON or variant, may refer to:

Geography
 Isön, a small island in lake Storsjön, Jämtland, Sweden

People

First name / given name
Ison (rapper), stage name of Ison Glasgow, a Swedish rapper of American origin

Last name / family name
David Ison, Anglican clergyman
Hobart Ison, American businessman
Paul E. Ison (1916–2001), American Marine during World War II
Sheila Ison (1944–2002), American political activist
Tara Ison, American novelist
Wayne Ison (1924–2014), American aircraft designer

Ison aircraft
 ISON Airbike
 Ison miniMAX
 Ison Hi-MAX

Music
 Ison (music), a drone note of Byzantine chant
 ISON (album), 2017 debut album by Iranian-Dutch singer Sevdaliza
 Mega Ison, a method of religious chant composition

Other
 Ison, a muscadine (Vitis rotundifolia) cultivar
 , an IRC command to see whether a nick is currently online

Acronyms
 International Scientific Optical Network or ISON
 Comet ISON, a disintegrated sungrazing comet

See also
 Ison Creek Kimberlite